The Swift Cambridge River is a  river in northwestern Maine. It rises near the New Hampshire border, north of Grafton Notch, and flows north to the Dead Cambridge River, a tributary of Umbagog Lake. The Androscoggin River flows from Umbagog to the tidal Kennebec River in Maine.

See also
List of rivers of Maine

References

Maine Streamflow Data from the USGS
Maine Watershed Data From Environmental Protection Agency

Tributaries of the Kennebec River
Rivers of Maine
Rivers of Oxford County, Maine